Stephen Raymond Hanson (7 August 1961 – 4 November 2015) was an Australian professional rugby league footballer in the New South Wales Rugby League (NSWRL) competition. He played for the North Sydney Bears and Eastern Suburbs. Hanson primarily played in the front row.

Hanson was selected to represent New South Wales as a last minute replacement for Phil Daley in game III of the 1988 State of Origin series. He scored a try in the match which would be his only State of Origin appearance.

On 4 November 2015, he died of complications of heart attack he had suffered two weeks earlier, while holidaying. He was 54.

Notes

Sources
 

Australian rugby league players
New South Wales Rugby League State of Origin players
North Sydney Bears players
Sydney Roosters players
1961 births
2015 deaths
Rugby league props
People from Bowral
Rugby league players from New South Wales